Znamenka is a rural locality (a selo) in Starooskolsky District, Belgorod Oblast, Russia. The population was 357 as of 2010. There are 8 streets.

Geography 
Znamenka is located 42 km southeast of Stary Oskol (the district's administrative centre) by road. Sergeyevka is the nearest rural locality.

References 

Rural localities in Starooskolsky District